Our Lady of Peace is a Roman Catholic title for the Blessed Virgin Mary.

Our Lady of Peace may also refer to:

Religious buildings
Cathedral Basilica of Our Lady of Peace, Lomas de Zamora, Argentina
Cathedral Basilica of Our Lady of Peace, La Paz, Bolivia
Cathedral Basilica of Our Lady of Peace, Potosí, Bolivia
Our Lady of Peace Cathedral, N'Djamena, Chad
Our Lady of Peace Cathedral, Bukavu, Democratic Republic of the Congo
Basilica of Our Lady of Peace, Yamoussoukro, Côte d'Ivoire
Our Lady of Peace Cathedral, Baja California Sur, La Paz, Mexico
Cathedral Our Lady of Peace, Trujillo, Venezuela
Church of Our Lady of Peace, Singapore
Church of Santa Maria della Pace (Our Lady of Peace, in English), Rome, Italy
Church of Our Lady of Peace, prelatic church of Opus Dei, Rome, Italy

United States
Our Lady of Peace Shrine, Santa Clara, California
Our Lady of Peace Church (Stratford, Connecticut)
Cathedral Basilica of Our Lady of Peace, Honolulu, Hawaiʻi
Church of Our Lady of Peace, New York City, New York
Our Lady of Peace Church (Erie, Pennsylvania)

Other uses
The Academy of Our Lady of Peace, a high school of the Diocese of San Diego
Our Lady of Peace High School, Malabang, Lanao del Sur, Philippines

See also
OLP (disambiguation)
Our Lady Peace, rock band